I Can See Your Voice (abbreviated ICSYV and stylized as I Can See Your Voice — Mystery music game show) is an international television mystery music game show franchise that originated in South Korea.

History
In 2012, producer and creator Lee Seon-young planned to develop a music game show. Besides with the existence of "good singers", she added "bad singers" and lip sync as format elements. Also, she was originally envisioned a program that will allow anyone to be the main character regardless of their appearances, and was inspired by Kim Bum-soo who struggled to gain recognition because of his look.

On February 26, 2015, I Can See Your Voice began to air on Mnet and through simulcast on tvN. Dubbed as the mystery music game show, it became an instant success in South Korea. This format having with "fusion of singing and guessing concepts" would later adopt to similar shows such as King of Mask Singer, and Super Hearer.

Because of its unique format, it was later sold to several countries and territories, which is distributed by CJ ENM alongside several syndicated television production companies.

Gameplay

Format
Presented with a group of "mystery singers" identified only by their occupation, a guest artist must attempt to eliminate bad singers from the group without ever hearing them sing, assisted by clues and a celebrity panel over the course of several rounds. At the end of the game, the last remaining mystery singer is revealed as either good or bad by means of a duet between them and one of the guest artists.

For the franchises involving an ordinary person as player, the contestant must eliminate one mystery singer at the end of each round, receiving a petty cash if they eliminate a bad singer. At the end of the game, the contestant may either end the game and keep the money they had won in previous rounds, or risk it for a chance to win a jackpot prize by correctly guessing whether the last remaining mystery singer is good or bad.

Rounds
Each episode presents the guest artist with a group of people whose identities and singing voices are kept concealed until they are eliminated to perform on the "stage of truth" or remain in the end to perform the final duet.

Visual round
The guest artist is given some time to observe and examine each mystery singer based on their appearance.
A muted video of each mystery singer that reveals only 0.3 seconds of their singing voice is played as an additional hint.
Each mystery singer is given two different identities — as a good singer and as a bad singer. Only one of them is their real identity.
The host is given three "keywords" depending on the mystery singer's identity. Afterward, five different voice snippets from the muted video are being played.

Lip sync round
Each mystery singer performs a lip sync to a song. Good singers mime to a recording of their own performance, while bad singers mime to a recording by someone else.
A mystery singer and a substitute lip sync together in one song. Only one of them is the owner of that recording.
The mystery singer lip syncs to the good singer's recording, then a bad singer's recording comes in the middle of the performance.
Separated into two phases, the mystery singers perform their lip sync, starting with good singer's recordings first and then bad singer's recordings being the last.
The mystery singers are divided into multiple groups of members, and participate in a lip sync performance to one song each.
A pair of mystery singers perform a lip sync of their own through a showdown to one song each.

Evidence round
Each mystery singer reveals an evidential piece. Good singers have own evidences, while bad singers had their evidences fabricated.
A proof of each mystery singer's singing ability (i.e. photo, video, certificates, etc.) is shown on the screen.
The host has randomly assigned clues about the mystery singer. The guest artist must choose a clue for each mystery singer.
The guest artist is presented with a video package in which one of the mystery singers discusses their life and musical qualifications.

Rehearsal round
Each mystery singer demonstrates a pre-show rehearsal piece. However, the voices of mystery singers still concealed with the use of audio distortion.
Three random panelists are wearing headphones to listen to a recording of assigned mystery singer that lasts for a limited duration. Afterward, the panelist defends the mystery singer and convince the guest artist to choose them as the winner.
The guest artist is presented with video from a recording session by one of the mystery singers, but pitch-shifted to obscure their actual vocals.

Interrogation round
The guest artist may ask questions to the remaining mystery singers. Good singers are required to give truthful responses, while the bad singers must lie.
The guest artist must pick one of three given "keywords" to question one of the mystery singers after detailing additional information about them.
The guest artist must choose one mystery singer to question with. The host is given a list of 15 questions shown on the screen and the artist can ask any of 15 questions within the 30 second time limit.

Confession round
Each mystery singer has a story of what kind of identity they have if the singer is bad. Good singers may lie, which is true for having their singing experience, while bad singers tell the truth to make everyone believe they can't sing.

Reception

Legacy 
I Can See Your Voice served as a launchpad for mystery singers including Hwang Chi-yeul, Lee Sun-bin, and Kim Min-kyu; gaining much success following the show.

Controversies 
In August 2015, CJ ENM accused two Chinese programs, God of Songs by SZTV and X-Singer by Beijing TV of plagiarism, which imitates its gameplay similar to ICSYV, therefore they were both declared as unlicensed Chinese adaptations. Despite this, God of Songs became successful due to high ratings and even trending on social media.

During an interview with CJ ENM head of formats Diane Min in June 2020, it was revealed that there was a dispute with Is That Really Your Voice?, another game show format by the Turkey-based Global Agency in 2013, in which I Can See Your Voice was accused as being plagiarized from their format. Despite this, it was later adapted in three countries.

Accolades
I Can See Your Voice was both nominated for Best Non-Scripted Entertainment Program category at the 44th International Emmy Awards and Best Light Entertainment Program category at the 2020 Venice TV Awards.

International versions

Since 2016, the ICSYV franchise has spawned 28 adaptations airing in 27 countries and territories. The Vietnamese program Giọng ải giọng ai (also called Hidden Voices) is also based on the original gameplay of ICSYV under modified battle format, which made formally recognized as part of the latter franchise that was later applied to ICSYV counterparts.

Notes

References

franchise
Television franchises